Manuel Varela can refer to:

 Manuel Varela (footballer)
 Manuel Varela (wrestler)